Vollebregt is a Dutch surname. Notable people with the surname include:

Erik Vollebregt (born 1954), Dutch sailor
Kelly Vollebregt (born 1995), Dutch handball player
Sjoerd Vollebregt (born 1954), Dutch sailor, twin brother of Erik

Dutch-language surnames